The eotvos is a unit of acceleration divided by distance that was used in conjunction with the older centimetre–gram–second system of units (cgs). The eotvos is defined as 10−9 galileos per centimetre. The symbol of the eotvos unit is E.

In SI units or in cgs units, 1 eotvos = 10−9 second−2.

The gravitational gradient of the Earth, that is, the change in the gravitational acceleration vector from one point on the Earth's surface to another, is customarily measured in units of eotvos. The Earth's gravity gradient is dominated by the component due to Earth's near-spherical shape, which results in a vertical tensile gravity gradient of 3,080 E (an elevation increase of 1 m gives a decrease of gravity of about 0.3 mGal), and horizontal compressive gravity gradients of one half that, or 1,540 E. Earth's rotation perturbs this in a direction-dependent manner by about 5 E. Gravity gradient anomalies in mountainous areas can be as large as several hundred eotvos.

The eotvos unit is named for the physicist Loránd Eötvös, who made pioneering studies of the gradient of the Earth's gravitational field.

References

Units of measurement
Non-SI metric units